The Sha'er Lake is a large coal field located in the north of China in Xinjiang. Sha'er Lake represents one of the largest coal reserve in China having estimated reserves of 89.2 billion tonnes of coal.

See also 

Coal in China
List of coalfields

References 

Coal in China
Geology of Xinjiang
Mining companies based in Xinjiang